Wasmuth is a Germanic surname. It may refer to:

People
Georg Ulrich Wasmuth (1788–1814), Norwegian military officer and politician
Henry Wasmuth ( – 1865), U.S. Marine during the American Civil War

Other
USS Wasmuth (DD-338), U.S. warship named for Henry Wasmuth (see above)
Wasmuth Portfolio, German architectural volumes published by Ernst Wasmuth in 1910, about the works of Frank Lloyd Wright

See also
Wassmuth, a surname